The 2016 AFC U-19 Championship qualification decided the participating teams of the 2016 AFC U-19 Championship. The tournament is the 39th edition of the AFC U-19 Championship, the biennial international youth football championship organised by the Asian Football Confederation (AFC) for the men's under-19 national teams of Asia.

A total of 16 teams qualified to play in the final tournament, including Bahrain who qualified automatically as hosts but also competed in the qualifying stage.

Same as previous editions, the tournament acts as the AFC qualifiers for the FIFA U-20 World Cup. The top four teams of the final tournament will qualify for the 2017 FIFA U-20 World Cup in South Korea as the AFC representatives, besides South Korea who qualified automatically as hosts. If South Korea are among the top four teams, the fifth-placed team (i.e., the losing quarter-finalist with the best record in the tournament) will also qualify for the 2017 FIFA U-20 World Cup.

Draw
The draw for the qualifiers was held on 5 June 2015 at the AFC House in Kuala Lumpur. A total of 43 teams entered the qualifying stage and were drawn into ten groups.
West Zone, with 25 entrants from Central Asia, South Asia and West Asia, had one group of five teams and five groups of four teams.
East Zone, with 18 entrants from ASEAN and East Asia, had two groups of five teams and two groups of four teams.

The teams were seeded according to their performance in the previous season in 2014.

Note:
1 Non-FIFA member, ineligible for U-20 World Cup.

Player eligibility
Players born on or after 1 January 1997 are eligible to compete in the tournament.

Format
In each group, teams play each other once at a centralised venue. The ten group winners and the five best runners-up from all groups qualify for the final tournament. If Bahrain are one of the group winners or best runners-up, the sixth-best runner-up also qualifies for the final tournament.

Tiebreakers
The teams were ranked according to points (3 points for a win, 1 point for a draw, 0 points for a loss). If tied on points, tiebreakers would be applied in the following order:
Greater number of points obtained in the group matches between the teams concerned;
Goal difference resulting from the group matches between the teams concerned;
Greater number of goals scored in the group matches between the teams concerned;
If, after applying criteria 1 to 3, teams still have an equal ranking, criteria 1 to 3 are reapplied exclusively to the matches between the teams in question to determine their final rankings. If this procedure does not lead to a decision, criteria 5 to 9 apply;
Goal difference in all the group matches;
Greater number of goals scored in all the group matches;
Penalty shoot-out if only two teams are involved and they are both on the field of play;
Fewer score calculated according to the number of yellow and red cards received in the group matches (1 point for a single yellow card, 3 points for a red card as a consequence of two yellow cards, 3 points for a direct red card, 4 points for a yellow card followed by a direct red card);
Drawing of lots.

Groups
The matches are played between 28 September – 6 October 2015 for Groups G and H (five-team groups); 2–6 October 2015 for all other groups (four-team groups).

Group A
All matches were held in Bangladesh.
Times listed are UTC+6.

Group B
All matches were held in Saudi Arabia.
Times listed are UTC+3.

Group C
All matches were held in Palestine.
Times listed are UTC+3.

Group D
All matches were held in Qatar.
Times listed are UTC+3.

Group E
All matches were held in Iran.
Times listed are UTC+3:30.

Group F
All matches were held in Tajikistan.
Times listed are UTC+5.

Group G
All matches were held in Myanmar.
Times listed are UTC+6:30.

Group H
All matches were held in Thailand.
Times listed are UTC+7.

Group I
All matches were held in China
Times listed are UTC+8.

Group J
All matches were held in Laos.
Times listed are UTC+7.

Ranking of second-placed teams
The ranking among the runner-up team of all groups are determined as follows:
Greater number of points obtained in the group matches;
Greater goal difference resulting from the group matches;
Greater number of goals scored in group matches;
Greater number of wins in the group matches;
Fewer score calculated according to the number of yellow and red cards received in the group matches (1 point for a single yellow card, 3 points for a red card as a consequence of two yellow cards, 3 points for a direct red card, 4 points for a yellow card followed by a direct red card);
Drawing of lots.

In order to ensure equality when comparing the runner-up team of all groups, the results of the matches against the fifth-placed team in the groups having five teams are ignored due to the other groups having only four teams.

Qualified teams
The following 16 teams qualified for the final tournament.

3 As South Vietnam
2 Bold indicates champion for that year. Italic indicates host for that year.

Goalscorers
6 goals

 Majid Lafi

5 goals

 Zhang Yuning
 Yu Chia-huang
 Reza Karamolachaab
 Han Il-hyok

4 goals

 Jasim Marhoon
 Alaa Abbas
 Abdulrahman Al-Yami
 Kang Ji-hoon
 Lee Dong-jun

3 goals

 Steve Kuzmanovski
 Ngan Cheuk Pan
 Nima Mokhtari
 Reza Shekari
 Koki Ogawa
 Jafri Firdaus Chew
 Sayed Issa
 Khalid Muneer
 Hami Syahin
 Choe Ik-jin
 Jeong Tae-wook
 Kim Si-woo
 Khotam Alisheri
 Anon Amornlerdsak
 Suksan Mungpao
 Bobir Abdixolikov
 Doston Ibragimov
 Hà Đức Chinh

2 goals

 Masuk Mia Jony
 Gao Haisheng
 Gao Huaze
 Lin Liangming
 Shan Huanhuan
 Chao Ming-hsiu
 Chen Hung-wei
 Cheng Chun-hsien
 Mohammed Hasan
 Jasim Mohammed
 Ameer Sabah
 Yuto Iwasaki
 Akito Takagi
 Tsubasa Yoshihira
 Aung Zin Phyo
 Asad Al-Awadi
 Abdullah Al-Ahrak
 Hazem Shehata
 Ayman Al-Khulaif
 Irfan Fandi
 Haiqal Pashia
 Gareth Low
 Kim Dae-won
 Kim Moo-gun
 Kim Seok-jin
 Afam Akram
 Nuriddin Khamrokulov
 Ehson Panjshanbe
 Amirdzhon Safarov
 Sorawit Panthong
 Ritthidet Phensawat
 Henrique Cruz
 Nelson Viegas
 Mihail Titow
 Hassan Al-Noobi
 Jassem Yaqoub
 Sanjar Kodirkulov
 Nurillo Tukhtasinov
 Hồ Minh Dĩ

1 goal

 Reza Allah Yari
 Nicholas D'Agostino
 Alusine Fofanah
 George Mells
 Dejan Pandurevic
 Mario Shabow
 Sayed Ahmed
 Talal Ali Al-Naar
 Sayed Ebrahim
 Mannaf Rabby
 Sonam Tobgay
 Yan Dinghao
 Yang Liyu
 Yao Daogang
 Kao Wei-jie
 Wang Li-an
 Chan Pak Hei
 Cheng Chin Lung
 Hirokane Harima
 Matthew Ho
 Nima Daghestani
 Mohammad Khorram
 Omid Noorafkan
 Ali Shojaei
 Amjad Attwan
 Hiroki Noda
 Daisuke Sakai
 Ahmad Harbi Abdallah
 Anas Ahmad Mahmoud Hammad
 Hijazi Maher Hijazi
 Abdallah Ibrahim She
 Abdullah Karam
 Khaled Al Enezi
 Naser Saeed
 Ernist Batyrkanov
 Kadyrbek Shaarbekov
 Uulu Yrysbek
 Maitee Hatsady
 Thanin Phanthavong
 Alex Boutros
 Ali Bahor
 Joseph Michel Lahoud
 Hussein Monzer
 Jorge Marcelo Vitorino
 Danial Ashraf
 Aung Moe Thu
 Htoo Kyant Lwin
 Ye Yint Aung
 Zin Phyo Aung
 Bimal Magar
 Jon Chung-il
 Pak Kwang-chon
 Zahir Al-Aghbari
 Talal Al-Awadi
 Mohsin Al-Ghassani
 Mohammed Obaid
 Munther Shobaki
 Mahmoud Yousef
 Javier Gayoso
 Abdelrahman Moustafa
 Bassam Al-Rawai
 Tarek Salman
 Mohammad Al-Bassas
 Fahad Al-Harbi
 Meshari Al-Kahtani
 Ammar Al-Najar
 Sami Al-Najei
 Ariyan Malik
 Justin Hui
 Joshua Pereira
 Karthik Raj
 Shah Zulkarnean
 Kim Geon-ung
 Kim Jeong-hwan
 Kwon Gi-pyo
 Alaa Edeen Yasin Dali
 Yousef Arafa
 Sunatullo Kholov
 Kuvvatbek Ravshanbekov
 Wisarut Imura
 Sirimongkhon Jitbanjong
 Worachit Kanitsribampen
 Rufino Gama
 Begenç Akmämmedow
 Guvanchmyrat Gurbangulyyev
 Mohamed Al-Jnebi
 Faisl Al-Matroushi
 Ahmed Rashed
 Mohamed Rahsid
 Husniddin Gofurov
 Sayidjamol Davlatjonov
 Sharof Mukhiddinov
 Sukhrob Nurulloev
 Lâm Thuận
 Nguyễn Quang Hải
 Nguyễn Tiến Linh
 Nguyễn Trọng Đại
 Phạm Trọng Hóa
 Trần Duy Khánh
 Abdulhakim Ahmed
 Mohammed Al-Huthaifi

1 own goal

 Ashique Kuruniyan (against Afghanistan)
 Terrence Thosert-Belcher (against Thailand)
 Basheer Farawi (against United Arab Emirates)

References

External links
, the-AFC.com

 
Qualification
2016
U-19 Championship qualification